Mastixia is a genus of about 19 species of resinous evergreen trees, usually placed in the family Cornaceae. Its range extends from India through Southeast Asia and New Guinea to the Solomon Islands. Mastixia species have alternate or opposite simple broad leaves, many-flowered inflorescences, and blue to purple drupaceous fruits.

The classification of Mastixia is inconsistent due to continuing investigation into its phylogenetic relationships. Although generally placed in Cornaceae, it has also been associated with the family Nyssaceae, when that family is removed from Cornaceae. Mastixia is also sometimes separated, along with the genus Diplopanax, into the family Mastixiaceae.

Fruits of this genus are common Paleocene fossils.

Species
 the World Checklist of Selected Plant Families and The Plant List recognise about 30 accepted taxa (of species and infraspecific names).

 Mastixia arborea  
 subsp. macrophylla  
 subsp. meziana  
 Mastixia caudatilimba  
 Mastixia congylos  
 Mastixia cuspidata  
 Mastixia eugenioides  
 Mastixia euonymoides  
 Mastixia glauca  
 Mastixia kaniensis  
 subsp. ledermannii  
 Mastixia macrocarpa  
 Mastixia macrophylla  
 Mastixia microcarpa  
 Mastixia montana  
 Mastixia nimalii  (M. nimali in IUCN)
 Mastixia octandra  
 Mastixia parviflora  
 Mastixia pentandra  
 subsp. cambodiana  
 subsp. chinensis  
 subsp. philippinensis  
 subsp. scortechinii  
 Mastixia rostrata  
 subsp. caudatifolia  
 Mastixia tetrandra  
 Mastixia tetrapetala  
 Mastixia trichophylla  
 Mastixia trichotoma  
 var. clarkeana  
 var. korthalsiana  
 var. maingayi  
 var. rhynchocarpa

References

 
Cornales genera
Taxonomy articles created by Polbot
Taxa named by Carl Ludwig Blume